This is a list of philosophers of religion.

A
AJ Ayer
AN Whitehead
Aaron ben Elijah
Adi Shankara
Al-Ghazali
Aleksei Losev
Alvin Plantinga
Anselm of Canterbury
Antony Flew
Aristotle
Aruni
Augustine of Hippo
Avicenna

B
Bahya ibn Paquda
Baruch Spinoza
Basava
Benedict Ashley  
Bhāskara
Boethius
Brian Davies

C
Cardinal Thomas Cajetan  
Charles De Koninck
Charles Hartshorne
Confucius

D
DT Suzuki
David Hume
David Kimhi
David Nieto
David ibn Merwan al-Mukkamas
Dmitry Merezhkovsky
Dogen

E
Elia del Medigo
Emanuel Swedenborg
Epicurus
Eugene Halliday

F
Fethullah Gulen
Friedrich Nietzsche
Friedrich Schleiermacher
Frithjof Schuon

G
G. K. Chesterton
Georg Wilhelm Friedrich Hegel
Gersonides
Guru Nanak

H
Hai Gaon
Hoter ben Shlomo
Huston Smith

I
Immanuel Kant
Isaac Alfasi
Isaac Canpanton
Isaac Cardoso
Isaac Nathan ben Kalonymus
Isaac Orobio de Castro
Isaac ben Sheshet
Isaac ibn Latif

J
J.P. Moreland
Jacob Abendana
Jacob Anatoli
Jacques Derrida
Jacques Maritain
Jedaiah ben Abraham Bedersi
Jeshua ben Judah
Johann Georg Hamann
John Duns Scotus
John Hick
John of St. Thomas (John Poinsot)
Joseph Solomon Delmedigo
Joseph ben Abraham
Joseph ibn Tzaddik
José Faur

K
Kundakunda

L
Lao Tzu
Leon of Modena

M
Madhvacharya
Maimonides
Melville Y. Stewart
Mircea Eliade
Moses Narboni

N
Nishida Kitaro

P
Paul Tillich
Pavel Florensky
Peter Abelard
Plato
Plotinus

R
Ralph McInerny
Ramanuja
Reginald Garrigou-Lagrange  
Richard Swinburne
Robert Cummings Neville
Robert M. Price

S
Saadia Gaon
Said Nursi
Salomon Maimon
Samuel ibn Tibbon
Sergei Bulgakov
Seyyed Hossein Nasr
Shem-Tov ibn Falaquera
Solomon
Solomon ibn Gabirol
St. Thomas Aquinas
Stephen R.L. Clark
Swami BV Tripurari
Søren Kierkegaard

V
Vallabha
Vasily Rozanov
Vladimir Solovyov

W
Walter Benjamin
Walter Terence Stace
Wesley Wildman
Whitall Perry
William James
William Lane Craig
William Paley

Y
Yeshayahu Leibowitz
Yiḥyah Qafiḥ

É
Étienne Gilson

See also
Index of philosophy of religion articles

Religion
 
Philosophers